Operación Triunfo is a Spanish reality television music competition to find new singing talent. The fifth series, also known as Operación Triunfo 2006, aired on Telecinco from 8 October 2006 to 26 January 2007, presented by Jesús Vázquez.

Lorena Gómez was the winner of the series.

Headmaster, judges and presenter
Headmaster: Kike Santander
Judges: Noemí Galera, Risto Mejide, Javier Llano and Alejandro Abad
Presenter: Jesús Vázquez

Contestants

Galas

Results summary
Colour key

Gala 0 (October 8, 2006) 

Songs:
 Claritzel – "If ain't go you", Alicia Keys
 Ismael – "Volverá", El Canto del Loco
 Eva – "La vida es bella", Noa
 Leo – "Devuélveme a mi chica", Hombres G
 Vanessa – "Más que nada", Sérgio Mendes
 Moritz – "Don't Let the Sun Go Down on Me", Elton John
 Mayte – "Voy a vivir", Gloria Gaynor
 Daniel – "Suspicious Minds", Elvis Presley
 Cristina – "Dulce locura", La Oreja de Van Gogh
 Jorge – "Historia de un amor", Bolero
 Mercedes – "Guerra fría", Pastora Soler
 José – "La ciudad perdida", David DeMaría
 Melissa – "Baila Casanova", Paulina Rubio
 Saray – "Bad Girls", Donna Summer
 Xavier – "Mi historia entre tus dedos", Sergio Dalma
 Encarna – "Tal para cual", Luz
 José Antonio – "Para ti sería", Nek
 Lorena – "I Surrender", Celine Dion
Results:
 Nominated: José, Xavier, Melissa and Claritzel
 Saved: José (41%), Xavier (27%)
 Expulsed: Claritzel (23%), Melissa (9%)

Gala 1 (October 15, 2006) 

Songs:
 Moritz and Saray – "One", U2 and Mary J. Blige.
 Vanessa and Mayte – "Lo echamos a suertes", Ella baila sola.
 Daniel and Eva – "Otra vez", Coti and Paulina Rubio.
 Lorena and Encarna – "The Reason", Celine Dion.
 José and José Antonio – "Todo", Pereza.
 Ismael and Leo – "Dime que me quieres", Tequila.
 Mercedes and Xavier – "No me crees", Javier Ojeda and Efecto Mariposa.
 Jorge and Cristina – "Déjame verte", Diego Martín and Raquel del Rosario.
Results:
 Favorites: Lorena, Jorge, Saray, Jose
 Favorite: Saray
 Nominated: Cristina, Mercedes, Encarna and Xavier
 Saved by teachers: Cristina
 Saved by participants: Mercedes (7 votes), Encarna (3 votes), Xavier (3 votes)
 Nominated: Encarna and Xavier

Gala 2 (October 22, 2006) 

Songs:
 Xavier – "Como todos", Nino Bravo.
 Encarna – "She Works Hard for the Money", Donna Summer.
 Mayte and José – "Tu corazón", Lena and Alejandro Sanz.
 Saray, Lorena and Mercedes – "Jumpin' Jack Flash", The Rolling Stones.
 Ismael and Moritz – "La casa por el tejado", Fito y los Fitipaldis.
 Jorge and Eva – "Burbujas de amor", Juan Luis Guerra.
 Vanessa and Cristina – "Será, será", Shakira.
 Leo, Daniel and José Antonio – "I'm a Believer", The Monkees.
Results:
 Saved: Xavier (53%)
 Expulsed: Encarna (47%)
 Favorites: Saray, Lorena, Jorge, Leo
 Favorite: Saray
 Nominated: Cristina, José, Moritz, Xavier
 Saved by teachers: Moritz
 Saved by participants: Cristina (7 votes), Xavier (4 votes), José (1 vote)
 Nominated: José and Xavier

Gala 3 (October 29, 2006) 

Songs:
 José – "Ángel", Jon Secada.
 Xavier – "It's Not Unusual", Tom Jones.
 Daniel – "Everlasting Love", Smokey Robinson.
 Lorena – "La gata bajo la lluvia", Rocío Dúrcal.
 Saray and Mayte – "Tu peor error", La Quinta Estación.
 Ismael and Vanessa – "What you're made of", Lucie Silvas and Antonio Orozco.
 Moritz and Leo – "My Sharona", The Knack.
 Mercedes, Eva and Cristina – "Los amantes", Ana Torroja.
 Jorge and José Antonio – "Dame", Luis Miguel.
Results:
 Saved: José (52%)
 Expulsed: Xavier (48%)
 Favorites: Jorge, Lorena, Saray, Leo
 Favorite: Saray
 Nominated: Jorge, Mercedes, Mayte, José Antonio
 Saved by teachers: Mercedes
 Saved by participants: Jorge (4 votes), José Antonio (4 votes), Mayte (3 votes)
 Nominated: Mayte and José Antonio

Gala 4 (November 5, 2006) 

Songs:
 José Antonio – "It's My Life", Bon Jovi.
 Mayte – "Eras tú", Merche.
 Leo – "Temblando", Hombres G.
 Saray – "Goldfinger", Shirley Bassey.
 Jorge and Mercedes – "Frío sin ti", Navajita Plateá.
 José, Daniel and Moritz – "Celebration", Kool & The Gang.
 Cristina and Ismael – "Usted abusó", Maria Creuza.
 Vanessa, Lorena and Eva – "Holding Out for a Hero", Bonnie Tyler.
Results:
 Saved: Mayte (53%)
 Expulsed: José Antonio (47%)
 Favorites: Saray, Leo, Jorge, Lorena
 Favorite: Jorge
 Nominated: Ismael, Cristina, Eva, Leo
 Saved by teachers: Ismael
 Saved by participants: Eva (5 votes), Cristina (3 votes), Leo (2 votes)
 Nominated: Cristina y Leo

Gala 5 (November 12, 2006) 

Songs:
 Cristina – "Esta soy yo", El Sueño de Morfeo.
 Leo – "Besos" El Canto del Loco.
 Lorena – "If You Don't Know Me by Now" Harold Melvin & the Blue Notes.
 Daniel and Saray – "Endless Love" Diana Ross & Lionel Richie.
 Mercedes and José – "Cómo pudiste hacerme esto a mí" Alaska y Dinarama.
 Ismael and Moritz – "La vida empieza hoy" Sergio Dalma.
 Eva and Mayte – "Teresa" Pasión Vega.
 Jorge – "Tu nombre me sabe a hierba" Joan Manuel Serrat.
 Vanessa – "Hot Stuff" Donna Summer.
Results:
 Saved: Leo (58%)
 Expulsed: Cristina (42%)
 Favorites: Jorge, Lorena, Saray, Ismael
 Favorite: Saray
 Nominated: Mercedes, Vanessa, Mayte, Eva
 Saved by teachers: Vanessa
 Saved by participants: Eva (5 votes), Mercedes (4 votes), Mayte (0 votes)
 Nominated: Mayte and Mercedes

Gala 6 (November 19, 2006) 

Songs:
 Mayte –"Va todo al ganador", ABBA.
 Mercedes –" Flor de romero", Pastora Soler
 Leo and Vanessa – "Resurrección", Amaral
 Lorena and Jorge – "No", Armando Manzanero
 Daniel and Eva – "True Love", Elton John & Kiki Dee
 Ismael – "Sunday Morning", Maroon 5
 Moritz and José – "You Can't Hurry Love", Phil Collins
 Saray – "Te conozco desde siempre", Malú
Results:
 Saved: Mayte (54%)
 Expulsed: Mercedes (46%)
 Favorites: Leo, Saray, Jorge, Lorena
 Favorite: Lorena
 Nominated: Eva, Moritz, José, Mayte
 Saved by teachers: José
 Saved by participants: Eva (5 votes), Mayte (2 votes), Moritz (1 vote)
 Nominated: Mayte and Moritz

Gala 7 (November 26, 2006) 

Songs:
 Mayte – "Profundo valor", Marta Sánchez
 Moritz – "Las malas lenguas", Santiago Auserón
 Lorena and Vanessa – "Queen of the Night", Whitney Houston
 Leo – "Cien Gaviotas", Duncan Dhu
 Eva – "Como hemos cambiado", Presuntos Implicados
 Jorge and Daniel – "Cuando nadie me ve", Alejandro Sanz
 Saray and Ismael – "What Now My Love", Frank Sinatra
 José – "Wake Me Up Before You Go-Go", Wham
Results:
 Saved: Moritz (58%)
 Expulsed: Mayte (42%)
 Favorites: Lorena, Jorge, Leo, Saray
 Favorite: Jorge
 Nominated: Vanessa, Daniel, Eva, José
 Saved by teachers: Daniel
 Saved by participants: Eva (4 votes), Vanessa (3 votes), José (0 votes)
 Nominated: José and Vanessa

Gala 8 (December 3, 2006) 

Songs:
 Vanessa – "Cançao do mar", Dulce Pontes
 José – "Quisiera poder olvidarme de ti", Luis Fonsi
 Saray and Lorena – "You Shook Me All Night Long", Anastacia and Celine Dion
 Jorge – "Vente pa' Madrid", Ketama
 Eva – "Hijo de la luna", Mecano
 Moritz and Leo – "Back in the USSR", The Beatles
 Daniel – "Blue Velvet", Bobby Vinton
 Ismael – "Atrévete", Cristian Castro
Results:
 Saved: Jose (74%)
 Expulsed: Vanessa (26%)
 Favorites: Jorge, Daniel, Saray, Leo
 Favorite: Saray
 Nominated: Ismael, Eva, Jorge, José
 Saved by teachers: Ismael
 Saved by participants: José (3 votes), Jorge (2 votes), Eva (1 vote)
 Nominated: Eva and Jorge

Gala 9 (December 10, 2006) 

Songs:
 Eva – "Lela", Rosendo Mato Hermida
 Jorge – "Dormir Contigo", Luis Miguel
 Moritz – "Satisfaction", The Rolling Stones
 Daniel – "Always on My Mind", Elvis Presley
 Ismael – "Welcome to My Life", Simple Plan
 Lorena – "Empiezo a recordarte", Mónica Naranjo
 José – "Vuelve el amor", La Unión
 Leo – "Loco", Andrés Calamaro
Results:
 Saved: Jorge (54%)
 Expulsed: Eva (46%)
 Favorites: Leo, Lorena, Daniel, Saray
 Favorite: Saray
 Nominated: Jorge, José, Lorena, Leo
 Saved by teachers: Lorena
 Saved by participants: José (4 votes), Leo (1 vote), Jorge (0 votes)
 Nominated: Jorge y Leo

Gala 10 (December 17, 2006) 

Songs:
 Leo – "El mundo tras el cristal", La Guardia
 Jorge – "Con sólo una sonrisa", Melendi
 José – "Tren de largo recorrido", La Unión
 Daniel – "Unchained Melody", Richard Clayderman & James Last
 Saray – "Stuff like that there", Bette Midler
 Ismael – "La noche me resbala", Señor Trepador
 Lorena – "Como yo te amo", Rocío Jurado
 Moritz – "Live and Let Die", Paul McCartney & Wings
Results:
 Saved: Leo (50.5%)
 Expulsed: Jorge (49.5%)
 Favorite: Daniel
 3 more voted by jury: 1st Daniel (29.0 points), 2nd Saray (28.5 points), 3rd Lorena (26.0 points)
 4 less voted by jury: 4th Moritz (23.5 points), 5th Leo (20.5 points) 6th Ismael (20.0 points), 7th José (18.0 points)
 elected by teachers: Moritz
 elected by participants: Leo (2 votes), José (2 votes), Ismael (0 votes)
 Nominated: Ismael and José

Gala 11 (December 28, 2006) 

Songs:
 Ismael – "Te extraño", Armando Manzanero
 José – "Rock with You", Michael Jackson
 Saray – "Grande, grande, grande", Mina
 Lorena – "Land of a Thousand Dances", Wilson Pickett
 Daniel – "Volverte a ver", Dyango
 Leo – "Milonga del marinero y el capitán", Los Rodríguez
 Moritz – "Stuck in the Middle with You", Stealers Wheel
Results:
Saved: José (56%)
Expulsed: Ismael (44%)
Favorite by jury: Lorena

Gala 12 (January 4, 2007) 

Songs:
 Saray – "Gloria", Laura Branigan
 Lorena – "Call Me", Blondie
 Daniel – "The Great Pretender", Freddie Mercury // "Unchained Melody", The Righteous Brothers
 Moritz – "Purple Rain", Prince
 Leo – "El ritmo del garaje", Loquillo y los Trogloditas
 José – "Veneno en la piel", Radio Futura // "Ángel", Jon Secada
Results:
 Favorite by jury: Moritz
 Most voted: Lorena, Moritz, Saray, Leo (22.1%, 19.5%, 17.6%, 15.1%)
 Duel: José and Dani (11.9%, 13.8%)
 Won the duel: Daniel (78%)
 Expulsed: José (22%)

Gala 13 (January 11, 2007) 

Songs:
 Daniel – "Your Song", Elton John
 Leo – "Ojos de gata", Enrique Urquijo
 Lorena – "Héroe", Mariah Carey // "Cómo yo te amo", Rocío Jurado
 Moritz – "We Will Rock You", Queen // "Las malas lenguas", Santiago y Luis Auserón
 Saray – "Respect", Aretha Franklin
Results:
 Favorite by jury: Daniel
 Most voted: Daniel, Saray, Leo (28%, 25%, 19%)
 Duel: Moritz and Lorena (12%, 16%)
 Won the duel: Lorena (62%)
 Expulsed: Moritz (38%)

Gala 14 (January 18, 2007) 

Songs:
 Leo – "Mediterraneo", Los Rebeldes // "El mundo tras el cristal", La Guardia
 Lorena – "Se nos rompió el amor", Rocío Jurado
 Saray – "Mack the Knife", Ella Fitzgerald // "Quiero cantar", Rosario
 Daniel – "Contigo aprendí", Armando Manzanero
 Daniel y Leo – "Diana", Paul Anka
 Lorena y Saray – "Tell Him", Celine Dion and Barbra Streisand
Results:
 Favorite by jury: Lorena and Saray
 Most voted: Daniel and Lorena (33.5%, 26.3%)
 Duel: Saray and Leo (19.6%, 20.6%)
 Won the duel: Leo (54.4%)
 Expulsed: Saray (45.6%)

Gala 15 (January 25, 2007) 

Finalists: Leo.Lorena.Daniel
Songs:
 Leo – "Oigo Música", M-Clan // "Besos", El Canto del Loco
 Lorena – "I Feel Good", James Brown
 Daniel – "Me and Mrs. Jones", Billy Paul // "Blue Belvet, Bobby Vinton
Results:
 Favorite by jury: Lorena
 Most voted: Lorena
 Duel: Daniel and Leo
 Won the duel: Daniel (55.4%)
 3rd Position: Leo (44.6%)

Gala 16 (January 26, 2007) 

Songs:
 Lorena – "Summertime", George Gershwin // "Land of a Thousand Dances", Wilson Pickett
 Daniel – "Overjoyed", Stevie Wonder // "Your Song", Elton John
Results:
 Winner: Lorena (50.7%)
 2nd Position: Daniel (49.3%)

References

External links 
 Official site
 Portalmix official site 

Operación Triunfo